John Hoyles Boone (April 30, 1848 – November 16, 1884) was a lawyer and politician in Newfoundland. He represented White Bay in the Newfoundland House of Assembly from 1882 to 1885.

The son of Thomas Boone, he was born in Twillingate and was educated there and at the Church of England Academy in St. John's. Boone went on to study law and was called to the bar in 1870. He practised law in partnership with James Gervé Conroy from 1872. Boone was named solicitor for the Newfoundland assembly in 1874 and served until 1882, when he was elected to the assembly.

Boone died of pneumonia at St. John's at the age of 36.

References 

Members of the Newfoundland and Labrador House of Assembly
1848 births
1884 deaths
Newfoundland Colony people